Watsons Bay ferry wharf is located on the southern side of Sydney Harbour serving the Sydney suburb of Watsons Bay.

Services
Watsons Bay wharf is served by Sydney Ferries Watsons Bay services operated by SuperCat class ferries.

Watsons Bay wharf is also served by Captain Cook Cruises peak hour commuter services to Circular Quay. At other times the Captain Cook Cruises Hop On/Hop Off Sydney Harbour ferry service operates via Watsons Bay wharf.

My Fast Ferry operates Sydney Harbour tourist services via Watsons Bay.

Transport links
Transdev John Holland operate three routes from the other side of Robertson Park:
324: to Walsh Bay via Vaucluse
325: to Walsh Bay via Nielsen Park
380: to Bondi Junction via Bondi Beach

References

External links

Watsons Bay Wharf at Transport for New South Wales (Archived 13 June 2019)
Watsons Bay Local Area Map Transport for NSW

Ferry wharves in Sydney
Watsons Bay, New South Wales